Nicandro Díaz González (born August 9, 1963 in Monterrey, Mexico) is a Mexican telenovela producer.

Filmography

Awards and nominations

Premios TVyNovelas

Premios People en Español

References

External links

1963 births
Living people
Mexican telenovela producers
People from Monterrey